Gymnopilus subspectabilis is a species of agaric fungus in the family Hymenogastraceae which contains the hallucinogenic drug psilocybin. 

The big laughing gym as it is affectionately known is known to grow singly or in large clumps on stumps and logs. While being very similar visually to Gymnopilus junonius this large gym has a scaly cap or occasionally a fibrous or almost smooth cap and prefers hardwoods. These large mushrooms can often be found on stumps and roots growing in large clumps or singly. 

Cap: 2 3/16"-6 13/16” convex to flat with an inrolled margin when young. Dry scaly or finely fibrillose especially toward the edge, becoming more scaly with age. Pale yellow with grayish or brownish orange bruises and discoloration 

Gills: broadly attached, white to pale yellow with brownish orange to light brown stains where bruised.

Stem: 3 ⅜"-3 ⅞"” tall and ½"-¾" thick. Pale yellow above the annulus and below is the same color but with gray orange discoloration. Parallel sides but tapered sharply at the base, occasionally swelling in the middle, moist, nearly scaly or finely fibrillose. Annulus is thin and membranous, almost fibrous evidence of it persisting to maturity often. Flesh is pale yellow developing brownish orange colors near the base

Spores:Rusty brown, ellipsoid, roughened or wrinkled, with distinctly  conical points, darkening in KOH 7.1-10×4.4-6.2 μm

Habitat: saprotrophic on hardwoods mainly stumps and roots

Microscopic features: pleurocystidia 21-37.3 μm long 3.8-7.2 width, scattered flask or bowling pin shaped and cheilocystidia 23.2-37.2 μm long 4.1-8.6 μm width, swelling in the center sometimes or shaped like a flask. Caulocystidia abundant above the annulus produced in dense clusters directly on the stem, bowling pin shaped occasionally cylindrical but with a distinctive head 20.1-47.5 μm long 3.8-9.3 μm width. Basidia are 4 spored club shaped to cylindrical usually constricted near the center 26.3-37.9×6.6-9.3 μm

KOH: spores darken in KOH 

Taste: Bitter 

Odor: strong mushroom odor

Look alikes: 

 Galerina marginata (deadly) light brown spores 
 Omphalotus illudens (toxic) yellow spores 
 Tricholomopsis sp. (Inedible) cream colored spores 
 Cortinarius sp. (Potentially toxic) rusty spores

See also

List of Gymnopilus species

subspectabilis
Fungi described in 1969
Taxa named by Lexemuel Ray Hesler